Mahir Önder Alkaya (born 6 July 1988) is a Dutch politician who has been a Socialist Party member of the House of Representatives since 18 January 2018.

Education 
Alkaya went to Amsterdams Lyceum, and graduated from Delft University of Technology.

References 

1988 births
Living people
21st-century Dutch civil servants
21st-century Dutch engineers
21st-century Dutch politicians
Delft University of Technology alumni
Dutch people of Turkish descent
Members of the House of Representatives (Netherlands)
Politicians from Amsterdam
Socialist Party (Netherlands) politicians